The King-Neimeyer-Mathis House is a historic house at 2145 Malvern Road in Hot Springs, Arkansas, opposite the Hot Springs Golf Club. It is a -story Craftsman style house, with a broad shallow-pitch gable roof. The house was built in 1917-18 by D. D. King as a summer house, apparently due in part to its proximity to the golf club.

The house was listed on the National Register of Historic Places in 2002.

See also
National Register of Historic Places listings in Garland County, Arkansas

References

Houses on the National Register of Historic Places in Arkansas
Houses completed in 1918
Houses in Hot Springs, Arkansas
National Register of Historic Places in Hot Springs, Arkansas
1918 establishments in Arkansas